The  2019 PGA Championship was the 101st edition of the PGA Championship, and the second of golf's four major championships in 2019, held May 16–19 at the Black Course in Bethpage State Park, Farmingdale, New York. This was the first edition under the new schedule in which the PGA Championship is the second major of the year, having previously been the final one for decades. It was the third major and first PGA Championship at Bethpage Black, which hosted U.S. Opens in 2002 and 2009, won by Tiger Woods and Lucas Glover, respectively.

Brooks Koepka won his second PGA Championship, and fourth major, by two strokes ahead of runner-up Dustin Johnson. By doing so he became first player to successfully defend both the PGA Championship and the U.S. Open in a career, and became fourth player to successfully defend two different majors in a career. At age 29 he became the only player currently under 30 to win at least four majors, and he returned to being ranked number one in the world. Johnson became the eighth player to have runner-ups in all four majors.

Koepka hit a joint record PGA Championship low score of 63 in the first round, and a 65 in the second, to have the lowest 36-hole score in major history, and the largest 36-hole PGA Championship lead (7 strokes) in PGA Championship history. He hit a level par 70 in the third round, to retain a 7 stroke lead going into the final day. He held a healthy lead until a late charge from Johnson brought him within one stroke, but a four over par 74 was enough to get Koepka over the line.

Given his recent win in the Masters, and his 2002 U.S. Open win at Bethpage, Tiger Woods had a lot of media attention leading into the tournament, but missed the cut. Given the length of the course, long hitters were expected to do well, and Koepka and Johnson were among the favorites. Rory McIlroy was also among the favorites but finished tied for eighth. After struggling recently for form, Jordan Spieth finished tied for third in his attempt to complete the career grand slam.

The leading PGA Club Pro, and winner of his second Crystal Bowl, was Rob Labritz. He finished tied for 60th at 10-over-par.

Course layout

Lengths of the course for previous major championships:
, par 70 - 2009 U.S. Open
, par 70 - 2002 U.S. Open

Field
The following qualification criteria were used to select the field. Each player is listed according to the first category by which he qualified with additional categories in which he qualified shown in parentheses.  Dates when a qualifying category will be completely determined are indicated in italics.

1. All former winners of the PGA Championship
Rich Beem, Keegan Bradley (9,11), John Daly, Jason Day (9), Jason Dufner, Pádraig Harrington, Martin Kaymer (3), Brooks Koepka (3,7,9,10,11), Rory McIlroy (4,5,9,10,11), Shaun Micheel, Phil Mickelson (9,10,11), Jimmy Walker, Tiger Woods (2,7,9,10,11), Yang Yong-eun

Davis Love III did not play.
Vijay Singh did not play due to a back injury.
Justin Thomas (7,9,10,11) did not play due to a wrist injury.
The following former champions did not enter: Paul Azinger, Mark Brooks, Jack Burke Jr., Steve Elkington, Dow Finsterwald, Raymond Floyd, Al Geiberger, Wayne Grady, David Graham, Don January, John Mahaffey, Larry Nelson, Bobby Nichols, Jack Nicklaus, Gary Player, Nick Price, Jeff Sluman, Dave Stockton, Hal Sutton, David Toms, Lee Trevino, Bob Tway, Lanny Wadkins

2. Winners of the last five Masters Tournaments
Sergio García (9,10), Patrick Reed (9,10), Jordan Spieth (3,4,7,10), Danny Willett

3. Winners of the last five U.S. Open Championships
Dustin Johnson (9,10,11)

4. Winners of the last five Open Championships
Zach Johnson, Francesco Molinari (7,9,10,11), Henrik Stenson (10)

5. Winners of the last three Players Championships
Kim Si-woo (9), Webb Simpson (9,10,11)

6. Current Senior PGA Champion
 Due to the change in the date of the PGA Championship, which moves the PGA Championship prior to the same year's Senior PGA Championship (specifically the week before), this exemption was not used in 2019.

7. Top-15 and ties in the 2018 PGA Championship
Daniel Berger, Rafa Cabrera-Bello (9), Rickie Fowler (9,10,11), Tyrrell Hatton (9,10), Kevin Kisner (9,11), Shane Lowry, Thomas Pieters, Jon Rahm (9,10,11), Chez Reavie (9), Adam Scott (9), Brandon Stone, Gary Woodland (9)
Stewart Cink (9) did not play due to a back injury.

8. Top-20 in the 2019 PGA Professional Championship
Danny Balin, Alex Beach, Rich Berberian Jr., Justin Bertsch, Craig Bowden, Jason Caron, Ben Cook, Stuart Deane, Andrew Filbert, Tyler Hall, Craig Hocknull, Marty Jertson, Rob Labritz, Brian Mackey, John O'Leary, Rod Perry, Casey Russell, Jeffrey Schmid, Cory Schneider, Ryan Vermeer

9. Top-70 leaders in official money standings from the 2018 Players Championship to the 2019 Wells Fargo Championship
An Byeong-hun, Abraham Ancer, Ryan Armour, Patrick Cantlay, Paul Casey (10,11), Corey Conners (11), Joel Dahmen, Bryson DeChambeau (10,11), Tony Finau (10), Matt Fitzpatrick, Tommy Fleetwood (10), Jim Furyk, Brian Gay, Lucas Glover, Branden Grace, Emiliano Grillo, Adam Hadwin, Charley Hoffman, J. B. Holmes (11), Max Homa (11), Billy Horschel, Charles Howell III (11), Im Sung-jae, Jason Kokrak, Matt Kuchar (11), Danny Lee, Marc Leishman (11), Hideki Matsuyama, Keith Mitchell (11), Ryan Moore, Kevin Na (11), Louis Oosthuizen, Ryan Palmer (11), Pan Cheng-tsung (11), Scott Piercy, Ian Poulter (10), Andrew Putnam (11), Justin Rose (10,11), Xander Schauffele (11), Cameron Smith, Brandt Snedeker (11), J. J. Spaun, Kyle Stanley, Kevin Tway (11), Harold Varner III, Jhonattan Vegas, Bubba Watson (10,11), Aaron Wise (11)

10. Members of the United States and European 2018 Ryder Cup teams
Alex Norén, Thorbjørn Olesen

11. Winners of tournaments co-sponsored or approved by the PGA Tour since the 2018 Players Championship
Cameron Champ, Kang Sung-hoon (13), Michael Kim, Adam Long, Graeme McDowell, Troy Merritt, Martin Trainer

12. The PGA of America reserves the right to invite additional players not included in the categories listed above
Kiradech Aphibarnrat, Lucas Bjerregaard, Alexander Björk, Sam Burns, Jorge Campillo, Ross Fisher, Ryan Fox, Dylan Frittelli, Chesson Hadley, Justin Harding, Brian Harman, Lucas Herbert, Beau Hossler, Shugo Imahira, Jazz Janewattananond, Brendan Jones, Kurt Kitayama, Patton Kizzire, Russell Knox, Satoshi Kodaira, Mikko Korhonen, Tom Lewis, Li Haotong, David Lipsky, Luke List, Mike Lorenzo-Vera, Joost Luiten, Shaun Norris, Adrián Otaegui, Eddie Pepperell, Pat Perez, Richard Sterne, Steve Stricker, Julian Suri, Michael Thompson, Erik van Rooyen, Matt Wallace, Lee Westwood

Charl Schwartzel did not play due to a wrist injury.

13. Players below 70th place in official money standings, to fill the field
Sam Ryder did not play due to a wrist injury.

Alternates (per category 13)
Bronson Burgoon (75th in standings) – replaced Charl Schwartzel
Kang Sung-hoon (76) – replaced Davis Love III but subsequently qualified under category 11
Richy Werenski (77) – replaced Sam Ryder
Patrick Rodgers (80) – did not play due to injury
Joaquín Niemann (83) – took spot reserved for AT&T Byron Nelson winner
Kelly Kraft (84) – replaced Justin Thomas
J. T. Poston (85) – replaced Vijay Singh

Weather
Thursday: Partly cloudy and breezy. High of 68 °F/20 °C. Wind NW 10–15 mph.
Friday: Partly cloudy with showers. High of 65 °F/18 °C. Winds SSW 10–15 mph, with gusts to 25 mph.
Saturday: Mostly sunny. High of 71 °F/22 °C. Wind NNW 5–10 mph. 
Sunday: Mostly cloudy. High of 68 °F/20 °C. Wind S 12–18 mph, with gusts to 25 mph.

Round summaries

First round
Thursday, May 16, 2019

Defending champion Brooks Koepka led after the first round with a bogey-free course-record 63. It was the second time Koepka had scored 63 in a major championship; the first being in the second round when winning in 2018. World number 119, Danny Lee was a stroke behind after a round of 64 which included eight birdies and two bogeys. Tommy Fleetwood was in third place, four behind Koepka. 16 players broke the par of 70, including world number-one Dustin Johnson. Masters champion Tiger Woods scored 72, a round that contained an eagle, three birdies, three bogeys and two double-bogeys.

Second round
Friday, May 17, 2019

Brooks Koepka shot a second round 65 which included seven birdies and two bogeys. He set a new record for the lowest 36-hole score in a major championship and his seven stroke lead over Adam Scott and Jordan Spieth also set a 36-hole PGA Championship record and was the largest at the halfway point of any major championship since Henry Cotton led by nine in the 1934 Open Championship. Scott was the only player to score lower than Koepka, with a round of 64 than included seven birdies in the first 14 holes and a bogey at the 17th. Danny Lee, in second place after the first round, dropped six shots in his first seven holes and finished with a round of 74.			

82 players made the cut at 144, four strokes over par. Amongst those missing the cut were Masters champion Tiger Woods and world number 8 Bryson DeChambeau. Three PGA club professionals made the cut: Marty Jertson, Rob Labritz and Ryan Vermeer. This was the most since the number of qualifiers through the PGA Professional Championship was reduced from 25 to 20 in 2006.

Third round
Saturday, May 18, 2019

Brooks Koepka maintained his seven stroke lead after a level-par 70, a round that included three birdies and three bogeys. His seven shot lead after three rounds was a record for the PGA Championship, although he failed to break the 54-hole scoring record of 196 held by David Toms in the 2001 championship. Jazz Janewattananond and Harold Varner III had the best rounds of the day, both scoring 67 and moving into a tie for second place. Also tied for second were Dustin Johnson and Luke List. Adam Scott and Jordan Spieth both scored 72, dropping from second place into a tie for eighth.

Final round
Sunday, May 19, 2019

Summary
Defending champion Brooks Koepka won the championship with an 8-under-par score of 272. Leading by seven shots at the start of the day, he had five bogeys in the last eight holes but held on to win, two strokes ahead of runner-up Dustin Johnson. With three holes to play, world number one Johnson had closed to within a stroke of Koepka, but dropped strokes at the 16th and 17th holes. Patrick Cantlay, Jordan Spieth, and Matt Wallace finished tied for third place, six shots behind Koepka. Jazz Janewattananond started the day in a tie for second place but dropped seven strokes in the last seven holes and finished out of the top 10. Only six players broke the par of 280.		

Rob Labritz won the crystal bowl as the leading PGA club professional at 290 (+10), tied for sixtieth place.

Final leaderboard

Note: Top 15 and ties qualify for the 2020 PGA Championship; top 4 and ties qualify for the 2020 Masters Tournament

Hole by hole scorecard progression

Cumulative tournament scores, relative to par
{|class="wikitable" span = 50 style="font-size:85%;
|-
|style="background: Pink;" width=10|
|Birdie
|style="background: PaleGreen;" width=10|
|Bogey
|style="background: Green;" width=10|
|Double bogey
|style="background: Olive;" width=10|
|Triple bogey+
|}

References

External links

Coverage on PGA Tour's official site
Coverage on the European Tour's official site
GCSAA tournament fact sheet

PGA Championship
Golf in New York (state)
Sports in Long Island
PGA Championship
PGA Championship
PGA Championship
PGA Championship